Bob Bryan and Mike Bryan were the defending champions and they eventually managed to retain the title by beating No. 6 seeds Michaël Llodra and Nenad Zimonjić 6–3, 6–3 in the final.

Seeds
All seeds received a bye into the second round.

Draw

Finals

Top half

Bottom half

External links
Main Draw

Men's Doubles